Vantimitta Venkata Rajendra Kumar shortly V. V. Rajendra Kumar (b: 1932 - d: 13 February 1981) was an Indian art director, publicity designer (Studio Roopkala) and film producer (Adithya Chitra Films).

Some of the notable films he worked on are Ramudu Bheemudu (1964) and Sri Krishna Tulabharam (1966). His first film as art director was Gutta Ramineedu's Chivaraku Migiledi (1960). He also produced Mathru Murthy (1971), Manushulanta Okkate (1976) and Mahapurushudu (1981).

Early life
Rajendra Kumar was born as Chalapathi Naidu in Koruturu, Nellore District, Andhra Pradesh, in 1932. He was often known in the film industry as V. V. R. Kumar. He assisted the National Film Award-winning art director T. V. S. Sarma before working independently.

Career
His first film as an art director was Chivaraku Migiledi (1960). Apart from Telugu movies, he worked on 15 Tamil films by C. V. Sridhar's Chitralaya and V. C. Guhanathan. His first film as a producer was Mathru Murthy (1971) in partnership with Kandepi Satyanarayana. His second film as producer, Manushulanta Okkate (1976), was the first partnership of the director Dasari Narayana Rao and the actor Nandamuri Taraka Rama Rao. The  producer credit published for his films was V. Mahesh, who is his younger brother.

Personal life
Kumar had two sisters named V. Sudarsanamma, S. Leelavathi, and a brother V. Mahesh who is a film and television producer and writer. Kumar was married and had three daughters named Suhasini, Sunandini and Shalini, and a son, V. Yajuvendra.

Filmography
Below is a list of few films worked by Kumar as an art director. Apart from the below listed films, Kumar worked on over 100 movies as publicity designer under his company Studio Roopkala.

References

External links 
 V.V. Rajendra Kumar's Photo
 Rajendra Kumar at Chithr.com

1932 births
1981 deaths
Indian art directors
Telugu people